Winfried Muthesius (born 28 August 1957 in Berlin) is a German painter, photographer and installation artist.

Life

Muthesius' great-grand uncle and aunt were German architect Hermann Muthesius and fashion designer Anna Muthesius. Since the 2001 death of his wife, Marianne Muthesius, he has owned a real-estate company. Muthesius is the father of Laura Muthesius (born 22 February 1990), a blogger and photographer. He lives and works in Berlin and Brandenburg.

Artistic work

Muthesius studied at the Berlin School of Arts (today the Berlin University of the Arts) from 1979 to 1984. Muthesius' first artistic stay abroad led him to the Accademia di Belle Arti in Florence in 1982–83. His work there focused on the city's architecture. Based on many sketches, Muthesius created his first works in Indian ink, watercolor, tempera and oil.

In 1982, he made the Brandenburg Gate in his home city of Berlin a motif in his works. These works demonstrate that Muthesius employs design through reduction, laying down the foundation of his present painting style. In 1988 he visited New York City for the first time, and has returned regularly ever since. In New York, Muthesius sketched soaring room perspectives and architectural highlights, particularly of the World Trade Center. In the aftermath of the September 11 attacks, he has been creating work relating to Ground Zero. When he received a working scholarship from the Berlin Senate in 1989, he continued using the Brandenburg Gate—the intersection of East and West—as his central motif.

Muthesius' first series of "cross pictures" and "skull pictures" date to 1991 and 1992, and he has continued them until the present. He began to develop the technique of pittura oscura in 1992. These are multi-layered pictures which give the effect of depth, combining photography and painting: Muthesius creates a painting, derived from a sketch. It is then positioned in a public room and photographed. The photograph is painted over, and again reproduced.

The Star series of large-format images was created in 1995. The subject of the Star and Cross series is violence in the past and present. Stars of David, beaten in with an axe and a chainsaw, explore the expulsion of the Jewish communities over the centuries as a reminder of the need for respect.

In the Cross pictures, Muthesius dissolves the static cross and creates an impression of movement. The crosses were applied with bitumen and oil on a large-format support made of wood.

Muthesius has focused to monochrome images in gold, such as the Golden Fields (the tabula aurea in the State Collection of Antiquities and Glyptothek, Munich) and Der Himmel unter Berlin, since 2002. From this, he developed a  "broken gold" technique. The support, decorated with gold leaf, is then partially destroyed and scratched on the surface. This illustrates brittleness and vulnerability in time.

Muthesius is inspired by the concrete forms in a room, which he outlines, paints, photographs, paints over, further processes, installs and places in new contexts. He intends to bring the observer into a conflict of perception which might alter their perspectives and views. Muthesius' starting point is an object whose core he reveals with a variety of techniques and reductions in several processes.

Analysis

"a source of life arose from death.

 wrote about Brandenburg Gates:

 wrote about Star:

Thomas A. Baltrock wrote about Cross:

 wrote about Golden Fields:

Christoph Tannert wrote about Pittura Oscura:

References

Bibliography 
 Winfried Muthesius. Berlin-Bilder. Berlin 1985.
 Winfried Muthesius. Peinture. M.P.M. Project Bastille, Paris 1988.
 Live Kunst: with Frank Dornseif and Winfried Muthesius from the Martin-Gropius-Bau. ZDF 1989
  (ed.): Winfried Muthesius. Peinture – Painting – Malerei. Münsterschwarzach 1990 (exhibition catalog in Paris, Cologne, Berlin, New York).
 Gallery vier (ed.): Winfried Muthesius. Brandenburger Tore. Berlin 1991 (catalog of the exhibition in Leverkusen, Cologne, Berlin and Paris).
 Thomas A. Baltrock (ed.): Winfried Muthesius. ZeitBrüche. Lübeck 1992.
  (ed.): Winfried Muthesius. hell Schützenhofbunker. Eine Installation von Winfried Muthesius. Münster 1994.
 Deutsche Gesellschaft für christliche Kunst (ed.): Winfried Muthesius. ZeitBrüche – unentwegte Kreuzwege. Munich 1995.
 Thomas Sternberg (ed.): Winfried Muthesius. Himmel, Malerei. Münster 2001.
 Winfried Muthesius. Stern. Berlin, Trier 2002 (catalog of the exhibition in Bischöfliches Dom- und Diözesanmuseum Trier, in cooperation with Galerie Michael Schultz, Berlin, and the Stiftung St. Matthäus).
 Winfried Muthesius. Golden Fields – Der Himmel unter Berlin. Münster 2003 (catalog of the exhibition in Berlin underground stations as part of the Ecumenical Church Day in Berlin).
  (ed.): Winfried Muthesius. ZeitBrüche. Bonn 2014.

External links 
 Literature on Winfried Muthesius in the catalog of the German National Library

1957 births
Living people
German contemporary artists
German male painters
20th-century German painters
20th-century German male artists
Artists from Berlin
21st-century German painters
21st-century German male artists
Berlin University of the Arts alumni